Sanderson is an Anglo-Scandinavian surname that means "Alexander's son", Sander is a common abbreviation for Alexander in Scandinavia and Dutch speaking Europe. It can also be a common anglicisation of other Scandinavian surnames, like the Norwegian and Danish surname Sandersen, particularly in America. The surname's spelling has varied, Sandrisson and Sanderisone being other examples, and modern spellings include Sanderson, Saunderson, Sandeson, Sandersen, Sandersson and Sandison.

Frequency and distribution
Most prevalent in:  United States – 28,922 people.
Highest density in:  Norfolk Island – (ratio 1: 288) 49th most common surname.

People with the surname
 Alex Sanderson, English rugby union player, brother of Pat Sanderson
 Amy Sanderson, (1876–1931), Scottish suffragette
 Bill Sanderson, Tennessee politician
 Brandon Sanderson (born 1975), American fantasy author 
 Brenton Sanderson, Australian rules football player and coach
 Cael Sanderson, American amateur wrestler
 Chris Sanderson, Philadelphia lacrosse coach and retired player
 Christian C. Sanderson, southeastern Pennsylvania historian
 Danny Sanderson, Israeli musician
 Derek Sanderson, Canadian former ice hockey player 
 Edward Sanderson (disambiguation), several people
 Ezra Dwight Sanderson (1878–1944), American entomologist and sociologist
 F. W. Sanderson, headmaster of Oundle School
 Geoff Sanderson, Canadian former ice hockey player
 George Sanderson (disambiguation)
 George Henry Sanderson, American politician of the 19th century
 George P. Sanderson, British-Indian Methodist missionary
 Gerald Sanderson (1881–1864), English cricketer
 Gordon Sanderson (1976–1977), Canadian murder victim
 Ivan T. Sanderson, Scottish-American biologist and writer
 Jake Sanderson (born 2002), American ice hockey player
 James Sanderson (disambiguation), several people
 Jesse O. Sanderson, founder of the high school of the same name in North Carolina, USA
 Joan Sanderson, British actress
 John Sanderson, Australian military officer and politician
 John Scott Burdon-Sanderson, English physiologist
 Josh Sanderson, Canadian lacrosse player
 Kate Sanderson, married name Kate Gerbeau (born 1968), English television broadcaster
 Kate Sanderson (born 2000), Canadian Olympic swimmer
Keith Sanderson (born 1975), American sport shooter
 Kerry Sanderson (born 1950), Australian businesswoman and public servant
 Lianne Sanderson (born 1988), English footballer
 Marie Sanderson (1921-2010), Canadian climatologist
 Martyn Sanderson, New Zealand actor
 Nikki Sanderson, English actress
 Ninian Sanderson, Scottish race car driver
 Oswald Sanderson, director of Thomas Wilson Sons & Co. and Ellerman's Wilson Line
 Pat Sanderson, English rugby union player, brother of Alex Sanderson
 Paul Sanderson (footballer) (born 1964), English footballer
 Paul Sanderson (volleyball) (born 1986), Australian volleyball player
 Peter Sanderson, American comic book critic and historian
 Phil Sanderson, Canadian lacrosse player
 Robert Sanderson (disambiguation), several people
 Scott Sanderson (disambiguation), several people
 Silas Sanderson, American judge
 Sybil Sanderson, American opera singer
 T. J. Cobden Sanderson, English artist and bookbinder
 Terry Sanderson (writer), British writer and gay rights activist
 Terry Sanderson (coach), Canadian lacrosse coach
 Tessa Sanderson, British athlete and Olympic champion
 William Sanderson (disambiguation), multiple people

Fictional characters 
 George Sanderson, character from the Pixar animated film Monsters, Inc.
 Major Sanderson, character in the Joseph Heller novel Catch-22
 Dave Sanderson, character in the Parks and Recreation TV series
 Ben Sanderson, character in the film Leaving Las Vegas
 Peter Sanderson, character in the 2003 film Bringing Down the House
 Raymond Sanderson, character in the film Harvey
Sgt. Gary “Roach” Sanderson, a protagonist in the 2009 video game Call of Duty: Modern Warfare 2
 Olaf Sanderson, fictional Icelandic ice hockey player in the film The Mighty Ducks
 The Sanderson Sisters (Winifred, Mary and Sarah), from the movies Hocus Pocus and Hocus Pocus 2.

See also
 Baron Sanderson of Ayot
 Jeppesen Sanderson, American company specialized in navigational information, operations planning tools, flight planning products and software
 Sanders (surname)

References

Scottish surnames
English-language surnames
Patronymic surnames
Surnames from given names